S.H. Hashmi (1935–20 March 2006) was a Pakistani advertiser and marketer who was a founding member and managing director of Orient McCann-Erickson. He was one of the pioneers of advertising industry in Pakistan.

Early life and career
S. H. Hashmi was born in Gaya, Bihar, British India in 1935. His father Syed Abdul Qudoos Hashmi was an Islamic scholar. He was the author and compiler of Taqweem-e-Tarikhi, the historical Islamic Calendrical Book, giving a comparative study of Hijra and Gregorian calendars for the period spanning 1,500 years; published by the Islamic Research Centre in Islamabad, Pakistan.

Awards and recognition
 Sitara-i-Imtiaz Award by the President of Pakistan
 Pride of Performance Award in 1993 by the President of Pakistan
 'Millennium Award of Lifetime Achievement' by the All Pakistan Newspapers Society in 2004
 'Akhbar Dost Award' in 2004 by the All Pakistan Newspapers Society

Death and survivors

Hashmi died at the age of 71 in Karachi after a prolonged illness which was repeatedly complicated with bouts of pneumonia and other complicating factors. He left behind his wife who later also died on 24 October 2014, two sons, Masood Hashmi and Mahmood Hashmi, and three daughters.

References

1935 births
2006 deaths
Muhajir people
Recipients of Sitara-i-Imtiaz
Recipients of the Pride of Performance
20th-century Pakistani businesspeople
Pakistani business executives